Ligustrum micranthum is a species of flowering plant in the family Oleaceae, native to the Bonin Islands and the Volcano Islands, both belonging to Japan.

Etymology
Ligustrum means ‘binder’. It was named by Pliny and Virgil.

References

micranthum
Flora of the Volcano Islands
Flora of the Bonin Islands
Plants described in 1846